Filwood is a council ward of the city of Bristol in the United Kingdom. It lies in the south of the city and covers the suburbs of Filwood Park, Lower Knowle and Inns Court.

Filwood Park
Filwood Park is a primarily residential area of Bristol. It has a number of primary schools.

Lower Knowle

Lower Knowle is a part of the Knowle area of Bristol that lies within the Filwood ward.

Inns Court
Inns Court, sometimes spelled Inn's Court, is an area of south Bristol that lies within the Filwood council ward. It contains a bus depot belonging to FirstGroup.

References

Areas of Bristol
Wards of Bristol